Edward Jackson Lowell (October 18, 1845 in Boston – May 11, 1894 in Cotuit, Massachusetts) was a United States (Massachusetts) lawyer and historian.

Biography
Lowell graduated from Harvard College in 1867. After his graduation, he spent several years studying and traveling abroad.  In 1868, he married Mary Wolcott Goodrich. He pursued a business career for a year or so, studied law, and was admitted to the Suffolk County, Massachusetts, bar in 1872. He practised law until 1874, when his wife died, and he gave up his practise to take care of his children and study.  In 1877, he married Elizabeth Gilbert Jones. He was a member of the Massachusetts Historical Society and a fellow of the American Academy of Arts and Sciences.

Works
 
  (1892)
 “The United States of America 1775-1782: their Political Relations with Europe,” a chapter from volume VII of Winsor's Narrative and Critical History of America (1888)  Some sources report the title of the section as “The Diplomacy and Finance of the Revolution.”
He wrote numerous magazine and review articles.

Family
He was a grandson of Francis Cabot Lowell.
His son, Guy Lowell, became a distinguished American architect and landscape designer.

Notes

References

External links 
 
 
 

1845 births
1894 deaths
19th-century American historians
19th-century American male writers
American non-fiction writers
Harvard College alumni
Lawyers from Boston
Historians from Massachusetts
19th-century American lawyers
American male non-fiction writers